Beruniy is a city in the autonomous republic of Karakalpakstan, Uzbekistan. It is located on the northern bank of the Amu Darya near Uzbekistan's border with Turkmenistan. The city is the seat of Beruniy District. Historically, Beruniy was known as Kath (Arabic/; modern ) and served as the capital of Khwarazm during the Afrighid dynasty. In 1957, it was renamed "Beruniy" in honor of the medieval scholar and polymath Al-Biruni who was born here. Beruniy received city status in 1962.

Beruniy is an important industrial city in Karakalpakstan. It is home to an asphalt plant, a brick factory, a cotton plant, and a shoe factory. There are also many textile factories.

History 
Beruniy was the capital of Khwarezm from the time of the Afrighid dynasty around 305 CE, replacing the old capital of Toprak-Kala. At that time it was known as Kath (modern ). The city underwent many name changes, including Fil and Shobboz. In 1957, it was renamed Beruniy in honor of the scholar and polymath Abū Rayḥān al-Bīrūnī who was born and raised in the town.

Beruniy received the status of a city in 1962. In 1969, Amu Darya River overflew its banks. As a result, several buildings in Beruniy were badly damaged. However, they were quickly repaired.

Geography 
Beruniy is located on the northern bank of the Amu Darya near Uzbekistan's border with Turkmenistan.

Climate 
Beruniy has a cold desert climate (Köppen climate classification BWk) with sharp continental influences. It has cold winters and hot summers.

Demographics 
In 2016, Beruniy had a population of 55,900.

Economy 
Beruniy is an important industrial city in Karakalpakstan. It is home to an asphalt plant, a brick factory, a cotton plant, and a shoe factory. There are also many textile factories.

Education 
Beruniy is home to 14 secondary schools, a music school and an athletic school.

References 

Cities in Uzbekistan
Populated places in Karakalpakstan